Lažai ('corvées', formerly) is a village in Kėdainiai district municipality, in Kaunas County, in central Lithuania. According to the 2011 census, the village had a population of 58 people. It is located 5 km from Surviliškis, by the river Liaudė, nearby Sosiai forest. There is a former school.

Demography

Images

References

Villages in Kaunas County
Kėdainiai District Municipality